Doștat is a commune located in Alba County, Transylvania, Romania. It has a population of 956 and is composed of three villages: Boz, Dealu Doștatului, and Doștat.

The commune is situated in the southeastern part of the county, on the border with Sibiu County.

Doștat borders Roșia de Secaș commune to the north, Șpring commune to the west, Păuca commune to the north-east, Presaca village to the east, Ludoș commune to the southeast, and the town of Miercurea Sibiului to the south.

Villages

Boz
Boz ( or Bussd) is a village in the Doștat commune. The name means elder bush in Romanian. The first document that mentions the village is from 1290. In 1786 there were 571 inhabitants recorded, in 1936 there were 1,013 inhabitants, from which 342 Transylvanian Saxons.

In 1992, after almost all ethnic Germans emigrated (mainly to Germany), there remained only 371 inhabitants.

Boz is the birthplace of the Lutheran priest Mathias Schuster (1912–1997), who  founded the village Rosenau in Seewalchen commune in Austria, as a refuge place for the German population (Saxons and Lander) from Transylvania and other parts of Central and Eastern Europe who had to flee after World War II in order to escape the communist deportation to the Soviet Union and imprisonment.

During the war, on their way to the Russian front, being enrolled in the German army (as Waffen SS), the men from Bussd wrote on the walls of the train in their home dialect: "Holt Dich, Stalin, un der Grunn, denn de Bussder kunn", "Tremble for your moustache, Stalin, 'couse the people from Bussd are coming!" .

A meaningful joke about Bussd can be found in a German newspaper: In the train from Kronstadt to Vienna, a peasant from Bussd is sitting next to a merchant from Vienna, who was continuously rhapsodizing about his beautiful city. Because the peasant wasn't paying any attention, the merchant asked him: So tell me, you really haven't been in Vienna before? The peasant then answered drily: Well, have you ever been in Bussd?

Gallery

References

External links

Images of the village

Communes in Alba County
Localities in Transylvania